The 2004 WNBA Playoffs was the postseason for the Women's National Basketball Association's 2004 season which ended with the Western Conference champion Seattle Storm defeating the Eastern Conference champion Connecticut Sun, 2–1. Betty Lennox was named the MVP of the Finals.

Format
The top 4 teams from each conference qualify for the playoffs.
All 4 teams are seeded by basis of their standings.

Road to the playoffs
Eastern Conference

Western Conference

Note:Teams with an "X" clinched playoff spots.

First round

Eastern Conference
(1) Connecticut vs. (4) Washington
Sun beat Mystics 2-1
Game 1: Washington 67, Connecticut 59
Game 2: Connecticut 80, Washington 70
Game 3: Connecticut 76, Washington 56

(2) New York vs. (3) Detroit
Liberty beat Shock 2-1
Game 1: New York 75, Detroit 62
Game 2: Detroit 76, New York 66
Game 3: New York 66, Shock 64

Western Conference
(1) Los Angeles vs. (4) Sacramento
Monarchs beat Sparks 2-1
Game 1: Sacramento 72, Los Angeles 52
Game 2: Los Angeles 71, Sacramento 57
Game 3: Sacramento 73, Los Angeles 58

(2) Seattle vs. (3) Minnesota
Storm beat Lynx 2-0
Game 1: Seattle 70, Minnesota 58
Game 2: Seattle 64, Minnesota 54

Conference Finals

Eastern Conference
Connecticut Sun vs. New York Liberty
Sun beat Liberty 2-0
Game 1: Connecticut 61, New York 51
Game 2: Connecticut 60, New York 57

Western Conference
Seattle Storm vs. Sacramento Monarchs
Storm beat Monarchs 2-1
Game 1: Sacramento 74, Seattle 72
Game 2: Seattle 66, Sacramento 54
Game 3: Seattle 82, Sacramento 62

WNBA Finals

Seattle Storm vs. Connecticut Sun
Storm beat Sun
Game 1:Sun 68, Storm 64
Game 2:Storm 67, Sun 65
Game 3:Storm 74, Sun 60

See also
List of WNBA Champions

References

External links
Link to WNBA Playoffs series, recap, and boxscores

Playoffs
Women's National Basketball Association Playoffs